Congo passport or Congolese passport, may refer to:
 Democratic Republic of the Congo passport for Congo-Kinshasha, the former Zaire, former Belgian colony
 Republic of the Congo passport for Congo-Brazzaville, former French colony

Passports by country